Henare Kaihau (1854/1860? – 20 May 1920) was a New Zealand Māori politician, serving as Member of the House of Representatives for the Western Maori electorate.

His birth year is uncertain. The Dictionary of New Zealand Biography gives a range from 1854 to 1860, whereas Wilson gives 1855.

Of eight candidates, he came fifth with 9.7% of the vote. In the 1896 election, he defeated Ropata Te Ao, and he held the Western Maori electorate to 1911 when he was defeated by Māui Pōmare.

Wilson notes him as a Reform Party supporter. Kaihau does, however, appear on a poster of the Liberal Party in 1910. The New Zealand Herald, in its  reporting, also lists him as a government supporter, i.e. a Liberal.

References 

1855 births
1920 deaths
Independent MPs of New Zealand
New Zealand MPs for Māori electorates
Members of the New Zealand House of Representatives
Unsuccessful candidates in the 1884 New Zealand general election
Unsuccessful candidates in the 1911 New Zealand general election
19th-century New Zealand politicians